The 1998 United States elections were held on November 3, 1998 in the middle of Democratic President Bill Clinton's second term and during impeachment proceedings against the president as a result of the Clinton–Lewinsky scandal. Though Republicans retained control of both chambers of Congress, the elections were unusual because this is the first midterm since 1934 that the president's party gained seats in the House of Representatives.

Several Senate seats changed hands, but neither party made a net gain. In the House of Representatives, Democrats picked up five seats, marking the first time since the 1934 elections in which the incumbent president's party did not suffer losses in either house of congress. This also occurred in 2002. This is the most recent midterm election in which no chamber of Congress changed partisan control. The 1998 midterms were the last time a Democratic President had a strong performance until 2022 when the Democrats under President Joe Biden outperformed.

The disruption of the six-year itch is attributed to wide opposition to the impeachment investigations against Clinton and his high popularity numbers.

Federal elections

Senate elections

In the Senate elections, Republicans picked up open seats in Ohio and Kentucky and narrowly defeated Democratic incumbent Carol Moseley Braun (Illinois), but these were cancelled out by the Democrats' gain of an open seat in Indiana and defeats of Republican Senators Al D'Amato (New York) and Lauch 
Faircloth (North Carolina). The balance of the Senate remained unchanged at 55–45 in favor of the Republicans.

House of Representatives elections

The House of Representatives elections saw a significant disruption of the historic six-year itch trend, where the president's party loses seats in the second-term midterm elections. Though Republicans won the national popular vote for the House by a margin of 1.1 percentage points and retained control of the chamber, Democrats picked up a net of five seats. This marked the second time since the Civil War in which the president's party gained seats in the House of Representatives in a midterm election, following the 1934 elections. Republicans would later gain seats during the 2002 mid-terms. The 1998 elections were the first time since 1822 in which the president's party gained seats in the House during the president's second mid-term.

Seats picked up by the Democrats included Kansas's 3rd district, Nevada's 1st district, Pennsylvania's 13th district, New Mexico's 3rd district, New Jersey's 12th district, Kentucky's 4th district, Mississippi's 4th district, California's 1st district, Wisconsin's 2nd district, Washington's 1st district, and Washington's 3rd district. The Republicans, however, picked up seats in Kentucky's 6th district, Wisconsin's 8th district, California's 3rd district, California's 36th district, Pennsylvania's 15th district, and North Carolina's 8th district.

The impeachment of Clinton likely played a major role in the success of the Democratic Party in the House and Senate elections. The election precipitated a change in Republican leadership, with Newt Gingrich resigning as Speaker of the House. A 2001 study by Emory University political scientist Alan Abramowitz attributes the Republican Party's poor performance in the 1998 elections to a public backlash against Republicans' handling of the Clinton-Lewinsky scandal and the impeachment proceedings against President Clinton.

State elections

Neither party made net gains in governorships. Texas Governor George W. Bush's landslide re-election solidified his status as a front-runner for the 2000 Republican presidential nomination.

References

 
1998
United States midterm elections
Elections